Hervé Lemonnier (born 9 January 1947 at Lisieux), in motorsport better known under his pseudonym "Knapick", is a French rallycross, rally and ice racing driver of the Andros Trophy series.

Biography
Lemonnier started his car racing career as a competitor in the 1966 Rallye Côte Fleurie. From 1969 on he began to hide his family name by entering competitions under the alias "Knapick". Being at the time a farm machinery dealer, he chose the brand of Knapick trailers for his pseudonym, to hide from his customers that he was one of these "crazy car racers" in his spare time. The businessman from Normandy later moved to Brittany to found a DAF Trucks dealership in Noyal-sur-Vilaine near the town of Rennes.

Results

Complete FIA World Rallycross Championship results

Supercar/RX1

a Loss of 15 championship points – stewards' decision

Complete Andros Trophy results

Elite class

References

External links 
A list of Lemonnier's rallying results
Website of Lemonnier's DAF Trucks dealership (in French)

1947 births
Living people
Sportspeople from Rennes
French racing drivers
European Rallycross Championship drivers
World Rallycross Championship drivers